Lugger may refer to:

 Lugger, a type of small sailing vessel
 Alexander Lugger (b. 1968), Austrian ski mountaineer
 7723 Lugger, a Mars-crossing asteroid
 Drascombe Lugger, a British boat design

See also
 Luger (disambiguation)
 Lugar (disambiguation)